Alois Reinhard was a Swiss rower. He competed at the 1928 Summer Olympics in Amsterdam with the men's coxless pair where they were eliminated in the quarter-final.

References

Year of birth missing
Year of death missing
Swiss male rowers
Olympic rowers of Switzerland
Rowers at the 1928 Summer Olympics
European Rowing Championships medalists